Polydema vansoni is a species of moth in the family Gracillariidae. It is found in South Africa.

References

Endemic moths of South Africa
Gracillariinae
Moths of Africa